The Wo Hing Society Hall is a building located at 858 Front Street in the Lahaina Historic District in Lahaina, Hawaii. Built around 1912, it served the growing Chinese population centered in Lahaina, primarily those working in the sugarcane industry as a social and fraternal hall for the Wo Hing Society. By the 1940s the declining  Chinese population in Lahaina slowly made the building redundant and the property was neglected.

In 1983, the Lahaina Restoration Foundation worked with the Wo Hing Society to restore the building to its former appearance. After restoration and construction in 1984, the museum was opened to the public. It currently operates under the name Wo Hing Museum and is one of only two existing Chinese Society Halls on Maui. It was placed on the Hawaii State Register of Historic Places on July 30, 1982, and, as Wo Hing Society Building, was placed on the National Register of Historic Places on November 15, 1982.

History
In 1852, many Chinese were brought to work on Hawaii's sugarcane plantations, mainly single men. When their contracts expired, some stayed behind and took up other trades. Due to the influx and distance from mainland China, Chinese Tong societies sprouted up to provide Chinese religious and political help, in addition to mutual aid, friendship, and funerary benefits upon death.

Sometime around 1909, the Chinese in Lahaina formed the Wo Hing Society, an offshoot of the Chee Kung Tong. Using private donations and funds, in 1912, the Wo Hing Society Hall was erected.

By the 1940s, many of the Chinese in Lahaina pursued new business opportunities in Honolulu. This led to the property being left derelict and prey to termites and rot. In 1983, the Lahaina Restoration Foundation approached the Wo Hing Society and entered into a long-term agreement to help restore the building and open it to the public. Restoration was completed in 1984, and is open to the public. It is considered to be one of the finest surviving Chinese Tong Society Halls in the State of Hawaii.

Buildings
The site is split up into a  main building with two floors and a cookhouse to the side. The first floor of the main building houses a collection of Chinese artifacts and memorabilia of Lahaina around the start of the 20th century. Most cover the years after sugarcane established itself on the west side of Maui.  The second floor features the only public Taoist temple on Maui. Altars dedicated to Lord Guan and other Chinese Deities are on the second floor, with a selection of other Chinese artifacts. The cookhouse was a separate structure, created as  a precaution to prevent the risk of fire damage to the main Wo Hing Temple. Today, along with displaying numerous cooking artifacts, it was converted into a mini theater. One highlight is the showing of films of Hawaii taken by Thomas Edison in 1898 and 1906.

Etymology and culture

Wo Hing literally means "harmony and prosperity" (Wo = Peace and Harmony, Hing = Prosperity) This is reflected in calligraphy boards around the temple.  The temple also utilizes Feng Shui principles, with the entrance (or front) of the building facing the ocean, and its back to the mountains.

Register of Historic Places placement dates

 Hawaii State Register of Historic Places - July 30, 1982 Site #50-03-1615 Chinese Society Halls thematic group
 National Register of Historic Places - November 15, 1982 #82000173 Chinese Tong Houses of Maui Island TR

Gallery

See also
Chinese Society Halls on Maui

References

Further reading

External links

Buildings and structures completed in 1912
Clubhouses on the National Register of Historic Places in Hawaii
Culture of Maui
Chinese-American museums
Chinese-American culture in Hawaii
Museums in Maui County, Hawaii
Ethnic museums in Hawaii
Clubhouses in Hawaii
Lahaina, Hawaii
1912 establishments in Hawaii
Properties of religious function on the National Register of Historic Places in Hawaii
National Register of Historic Places in Maui County, Hawaii
Hawaii Register of Historic Places